Patrick Colleary is an Irish Roman Catholic priest accused of molesting a person under the age of 15 while a priest at Holy Spirit Catholic Church in Tempe, Arizona.

He was suspended in May 2002 after he admitted fathering a child with a woman named Sharon Roy in 1978. She claimed the encounter was non-consensual. However, in a 1997 article, Ms. Roy spoke of a consensual physical relationship with Colleary. In 2002 Colleary was jailed for a month after being accused of molesting a young man, but charges were dismissed under the statute of limitations. 

Colleary was indicted on a separate charge of molestation and another warrant was issued for his arrest in 2003.  Colleary is currently living in Ireland, and has fought extradition back to Arizona, primarily the basis of the controversy surrounding Maricopa County Sheriff Joe Arpaio. He has denied all charges.

References

External links
 A bishop cops a plea, but for victims it's not nearly enough (U.S. News & World Report, 16 June 03)
U.S. News & World Report coverage
New York Times coverage of Colleary case

See also
Roman Catholic Church sex abuse scandal
Roman Catholic priests accused of sex offenses
Sex Crimes and the Vatican (Panorama Documentary Episode)
Ferns Report, on sexual abuse in the Roman Catholic Diocese of Ferns (Ireland)
Barbara Blaine founder of SNAP (Survivors Network for those Abused by Priests)

Living people
20th-century Irish Roman Catholic priests
Year of birth missing (living people)
Place of birth missing (living people)